A planetary phase is a certain portion of a planet's area that reflects sunlight as viewed from a given vantage point, as well as the period of time during which it occurs.

Inferior planets
The two inferior planets, Mercury and Venus, which have orbits that are smaller than the Earth's, exhibit the full range of phases as does the Moon, when seen through a telescope. Their phases are "full" when they are at superior conjunction, on the far side of the Sun as seen from the Earth. It is possible to see them at these times, since their orbits are not exactly in the plane of Earth's orbit, so they usually appear to pass slightly above or below the Sun in the sky. Seeing them from the Earth's surface is difficult, because of sunlight scattered in Earth's atmosphere, but observers in space can see them easily if direct sunlight is blocked from reaching the observer's eyes. The planets' phases are "new" when they are at inferior conjunction, passing more or less between the Sun and the Earth. Sometimes they appear to cross the solar disk, which is called a transit of the planet. At intermediate points on their orbits, these planets exhibit the full range of crescent and gibbous phases.

Superior planets
The superior planets, orbiting outside the Earth's orbit, do not exhibit the full range of phases as they appear almost always as gibbous or full. However, Mars often appears significantly gibbous, when it is illuminated by the Sun at a very different angle than it is seen by an observer on Earth, so an observer on Mars would see the Sun and the Earth widely separated in the sky. This effect is not easily noticeable for the giant planets, from Jupiter outward, since they are so far away that the Sun and the Earth, as seen from these outer planets, would appear to be in almost the same direction.

See here also
 Earth phase
 Lunar phase
 Phases of Venus

Further reading
 One Schaaf, Fred. The 50 Best Sights in Astronomy and How to See Them: Observing Eclipses, Bright Comets, Meteor Showers, and Other Celestial Wonders. Hoboken, New Jersey: John Wiley, 2007. Print.
 Two Ganguly, J. Thermodynamics in Earth and Planetary Sciences. Berlin: Springer, 2008. Print.
 Three Ford, Dominic. The Observer's Guide to Planetary Motion: Explaining the Cycles of the Night Sky. Dordrecht: Springer, 2014. Print.

Observational astronomy